James Donald Clark (1 May 1923 – February 1994) was a Scottish professional footballer who played as a full back.

Career
Born in Dornoch, Clark played for Aberdeen, Exeter City, Bradford City and Gloucester City.

He played for Bradford City between September 1952 and October 1952, making 6 appearances in the Football League.

Sources

References

1923 births
1994 deaths
Scottish footballers
Aberdeen F.C. players
Exeter City F.C. players
Bradford City A.F.C. players
Gloucester City A.F.C. players
English Football League players
Association football fullbacks
Sportspeople from Highland (council area)